Thomas Daniel Jones (1884 – 8 February 1958) was a Welsh footballer and football club manager. He represented Wales at international level on one occasion.

Jones was born in Aberaman where his father was a grocer and also the Constable of Higher Miskin, an ancient office and ceremonial post. He played for his local side before joining Aberdare Athletic in 1903.

In 1904, Jones joined Nottingham Forest, remaining an amateur as he did throughout his career. He made two league appearances for Forest.

In 1908 he made his only appearance for the Wales national team, a 1–0 defeat against Ireland, played at Aberdare.

In the summer of 1923, Jones took over as secretary-manager of Merthyr Town, guiding them to a respectable 13th place in Division Three (South). He left his post in 1924 and later worked as a scout for Cardiff City. He was also a vice-president of the FA of Wales.

References

1884 births
1958 deaths
Welsh footballers
English Football League players
Aberdare Athletic F.C. players
Nottingham Forest F.C. players
Wales international footballers
Association football inside forwards
Date of birth unknown